Piątkowski (feminine: Piątkowska, plural: Piątkowscy) is a Polish surname. Notable people with the surname include:

Aleksandra Piątkowska, Polish diplomat
Andrzej Piątkowski (1934–2010), Polish sabreur
Dominika Piątkowska (born 1986), Polish figure skater
Edmund Piątkowski (born 1936), Polish track and field athlete
Eric Piatkowski (born 1970), American basketball player
Ewa Piątkowska, Polish boxer
Ewa Piątkowska (volleyball), Polish volleyball player
Kamil Piątkowski, Polish footballer
Maria Piątkowska (born 1931), Polish sprinter, hurdler, and long jumper
Mateusz Piątkowski (born 1984), Polish footballer
Walt Piatkowski (born 1945), American basketball player

See also
Starkowiec Piątkowski, a village in Greater Poland
Załazek Piątkowski, a village in Subcarpathian Voivodeship in Poland

Polish-language surnames